Beşbölük is a village in the Baskil District of Elazığ Province in Turkey. The village is populated by Kurds of the Zeyve tribe and had a population of 45 in 2021.

The hamlets of Çavuşlar, Gülüşağı and Söylü are attached to the village.

The eggplants grown in the village have an eliptical shape and are becoming more popular in the region. During the winter, heavy snowfalls often close the roads to the village.

References

Villages in Baskil District
Kurdish settlements in Elazığ Province